Codium bursa  is a green marine algae of medium size.

Description
Codium bursa is a marine alga growing to 30 cm across. It generally appears as a spongy sphere of utricles which at the surface form a cortex. It is composed of loosely packed filaments which at the surface form a cortex of utricles which are single celled bladder-like or club-shaped structures.<ref name="Burrows"  It has a velvety texture and is dark green in colour.  The alga is attached by a holdfast of filaments.

Distribution
Rare in the British Isles, the most recent record was in 1977 from County Donegal. also recorded from other countries in Europe.

Habitat
Codium bursa grows sublittorally attached to rock to 10 m deep.

See also
 Marimo, a round, freshwater algae

References

bursa